Andy Horowitz is a historian and author. In 2021, he won a Bancroft Prize for his book Katrina: A History, 1915-2015 about the flooding caused by Hurricane Katrina in New Orleans, Louisiana and the aftermath of the disaster.

He is an assistant professor of history at Tulane University.

Publications
 Katrina: A History, 1915-2015, Harvard University Press (2020)

Awards and honours
 2021: Bancroft Prize for Katrina: A History, 1915-2015

References

21st-century American historians
Historians of the United States
American male non-fiction writers
Tulane University faculty
Living people
Year of birth missing (living people)
Place of birth missing (living people)
Bancroft Prize winners